The Arroux is a river in central France. It is a right tributary of the Loire. Its source is east of Arnay-le-Duc, in Côte-d'Or. The Arroux flows generally south through the following departments and towns:

 Côte-d'Or: Arnay-le-Duc
 Saône-et-Loire: Autun, Toulon-sur-Arroux, Gueugnon

The Arroux flows into the river Loire near Digoin, the main tributaries are the Ternin (48 km) and the Bourbince (82 km).

References

Rivers of France
Rivers of Bourgogne-Franche-Comté
Rivers of Côte-d'Or
Rivers of Saône-et-Loire